The Shiloh Baptist Church (Old Site) is a historic Baptist church at 810 Sophia Street in downtown Fredericksburg, Virginia.  The church is a two-story brick building with predominantly Classical Revival styling, modeled to some degree after the Presbyterian Church of Fredericksburg, with later alterations.  The church was built in 1890 for a predominantly African-American congregation, whose origins lie in a mixed-race Baptist congregation founded in 1804.  That congregation split about 1815, worshipping in a building at this site, and became known as the Shiloh Baptist Church with the construction of a new building here in the 1830s.  In 1849 the large congregation again divided, with most of its white members leaving to form the Fredericksburg Baptist Church at Princess Anne and Amelia Streets.  Services were discontinued during the American Civil War, and the existing building was damaged, in part due to abuse caused during military occupation of the city.  It collapsed in 1886, and the present building was constructed in 1890 as its replacement.  However, due to a schism in the congregation, two separate groups claimed the name "Shiloh Baptist", which was resolved by giving the one at this location the name "Shiloh Baptist Church (Old Site)", which it still retains.

The church was listed on the National Register of Historic Places in 2015.

References

External links
Shiloh Baptist Church (Old Site) website
Fredericksburg Baptist Church website

19th-century Baptist churches in the United States
Churches on the National Register of Historic Places in Virginia
Presbyterian churches in Virginia
Churches completed in 1890
Churches in Fredericksburg, Virginia
National Register of Historic Places in Fredericksburg, Virginia
1804 establishments in Virginia